Fear of the Dawn is the fourth studio album by the American rock musician Jack White, released on April 8, 2022, through Third Man Records. The album was written in Nashville and recorded throughout 2021 at Third Man Studio.

Promotion and release
In October 2021, White released "Taking Me Back", his first solo single since 2018. In November, White revealed that he would release two solo albums in 2022: Fear of the Dawn, which will feature White's traditional rock sound, and Entering Heaven Alive, a folk album, planned for release on July 22. White released a video for "Taking Me Back" on November 11. 

In December 2021, White announced the Supply Chain Issues Tour kicking off on April 8, 2022, in Detroit, Michigan. The tour covers North America and Europe. On February 11, 2022, White released the title track "Fear of the Dawn" as the B-side of the lead single from Entering Heaven Alive, "Love Is Selfish", and uploaded the music video for "Fear of the Dawn" on YouTube the same day. On March 3, 2022, White released the song "Hi-De-Ho" (which features rapper Q-Tip, formerly of hip hop group A Tribe Called Quest) as the second standalone single from Fear of the Dawn. Finally on April 7, 2022, White released "What's the Trick?" as one last surprise single the day before the album was released.

Fear of the Dawn was released on April 8, 2022.

Track listing

Sample credits
 "Hi-De-Ho" contains a sample of "Hi De Ho Man" by Cab Calloway, written by Cab Calloway, Buster Harding and Jack Palmer.
 "Into the Twilight" contains a sample of William S. Burroughs from the track "Origin and Theory of the Tape Cut-Ups" originally released on the album Break Through in Grey Room, produced by James Grauerholz and Bill Rich.
 "Into the Twilight" contains a sample of "Another Night in Tunisia" performed by The Manhattan Transfer, written by John Dizzy Gillespie, Frank Paparelli and Jon Hendricks.
 "Into the Twilight" contains a sample of "Twilight Zone/Twilight Tone" performed by The Manhattan Transfer, music written by Jay Graydon and Alan Paul, lyrics by Alan Paul.

Personnel
Primary artist
 Jack White – vocals (tracks 1–6, 8–12), drums (tracks 1–4, 8, 12), guitar (tracks 1–3, 5–11), bass (tracks 1–3, 8, 12), synthesizers (tracks 1–4, 6), percussion (tracks 1–4, 6, 8, 9, 11), theremin (tracks 2, 3), lead electric guitar (track 4), lead acoustic guitar (track 4), samples (track 6), piano (tracks 6, 12), electric guitar (track 12), vibraphone (track 12), acoustic guitar (track 12)

Session musicians
 Q-Tip – vocals (track 4), handclaps (track 4)
 Olivia Jean – electric guitar (track 4), acoustic rhythm guitar (track 4)
 Daru Jones – drums (tracks 5, 9–11)
 Dominic Davis – bass guitar (tracks 5, 10, 11)
 Quincy McCrary – Wurlitzer electronic piano (tracks 5, 10), Hammond B3 organ (track 6), synthesizer (track 9), harmony vocals (track 9)
 Scarlett White – bass guitar (track 6)
 Mark Watrous – Juno synthesizer (track 7), synthesizer (track 11)
 Bone Dust Mancini – 1975 Harley-Davidson Ironhead (track 8)
 Jack Lawrence – bass guitar (track 9)
 Duane Denison – rhythm guitar (track 11), guitar solo (track 11)

Technical personnel
 Jack White – production, engineering, mixing
 Joshua V. Smith – engineering, mixing
 Bill Skibbe – engineering, mixing, mastering
 Dan Mancini – engineering assistant

Packaging
 Jennifer Dionisio – cover illustration
 Sara Deck – page 1 illustration
 Olivia Jean – page 5 illustration
 Mikel Janín – page 3 illustration
 Ben Jenkins – side 1 label illustration, side 2 label concept, raven
 Bruce Yan – sun emblem, side 2 label illustration
 Johnny Dombrowski – page 4 illustration, back cover illustration, back cover camouflage patterns, paneled illustration

Charts

References

2022 albums
Jack White albums
Third Man Records albums